Alexander Neville was a bishop.

Alexander or Alex Neville may also refer to:

Alexander Neville (scholar) (1544–1614), English scholar, historian and translator, and MP
Alex Neville, musician on Off the Black
Alex Neville, character in BlinkyTM
Alexander Nevill (priest) (1912–2003), Irish Anglican priest; Archdeacon of Ossory and Leighlin

See also
Alex Nevil, actor